Velvet tamarind is a common name for several trees in the genus Dialium and may refer to:

 Dialium cochinchinense, native to southeast Asia
 Dialium guineense, native to Africa
 Dialium indum, native to south and southeast Asia